Lajos Puskás (born 13 August 1944) is a Hungarian football forward who played for Hungary in the 1966 FIFA World Cup. He also played for Vasas SC.

References

External links
 FIFA profile

1944 births
Living people
Hungarian footballers
Hungary international footballers
Association football forwards
Vasas SC players
1966 FIFA World Cup players
Hungarian football managers
Apollon Pontou FC managers
Vasas SC managers
Debreceni VSC managers
Diósgyőri VTK managers
Sportspeople from Hajdú-Bihar County